The Insolvency and Bankruptcy Board of India (IBBI) is the regulator for overseeing insolvency proceedings and entities like Insolvency Professional Agencies (IPA), Insolvency Professionals (IP) and Information Utilities (IU) in India. It was established on 1 October 2016 and given statutory powers through the Insolvency and Bankruptcy Code, which was passed by Lok Sabha on 5 May 2016. It covers Individuals, Companies, Limited Liability Partnerships and Partnership firms.  The new code will speed up the resolution process for stressed assets in the country. It attempts to simplify the process of insolvency and bankruptcy proceedings. It handles the cases using two tribunals like NCLT (National company law tribunal) and Debt recovery tribunal. 

Dr. Navrang Saini, Dr. Ms. Mukulita Vijayawargiya and Sh. Sudhaker Shukla are currently the Whole Time Members of IBBI.Central Govt. appointed Jayanti Prasad as a whole-time Member of the IBBI

IBBI Governing Board 
IBBI will have 10 members, including representatives from the Ministries of Finance, Law and corporate affairs, and the Reserve Bank of India.As per the statements on their official website, IBBI regulates a process as well as a profession. IBBI has regulatory oversight on Insolvency Professionals , Insolvency Professional Agencies, Insolvency Professional Entities and Information Utilities. Currently it has 130 Insolvency Professional Entities listed on its website.

The Governing Board

References

External links 

Executive branch of the government of India
Regulatory agencies of India
Organisations based in Delhi
India
Government agencies established in 2016
Government agencies of India
Economic history of India (1947–present)
Insolvency
Bankruptcy